Ignacio de Ries (c. 1612 – after 1661) was a Spanish Baroque painter.

Life
He was probably born in Flanders, then part of the Spanish Netherlands. Written sources show him active in Seville between 1636 and 1661. From his very first works onwards his technique shows a remarkable closeness to that of Zurbarán, in whose studio he was recorded in 1636, though his subjects were different to Zurbarán's and more Rubenesque. In his final years he was also influenced by Murillo, adding greater dynamism to his work without renouncing his original style. He probably died in Seville.

Selected works

Capilla de la Concepción, Segovia Cathedral (1653)
This chapel was founded in 1645 by captain Pedro Fernández de Miñano y Contreras and contains de Ries' most important works.
 The Tree of Life, a Vanitas-type allegorical curiosity.
 Adoration of the Shepherds 
 Conversion of St Paul
 Baptism of Christ 
 Coronation of the Virgin 
 King David

Capilla de San Antonio, Seville Cathedral
 Saints Isidore and Leander
 Saints Justa and Rufina

Seville
 The Immaculate Conception (San Ildefonso)
 The Immaculate Conception (Museo de Bellas Artes)
 Saint Justa (Colección Salinas)
 Assumption of the Virgin (1661, San Bartolomé)

Other
 San Michael the Archangel (Marquand Collection, Metropolitan Museum of Art)
 Regina Coeli (Colección Banco Central Hispano)

Bibliography 
  Pérez Sánchez, Alonso E., Pintura Barroca en España, 1600-1750. Editorial Cátedra, Madrid 

17th-century Flemish painters
17th-century Spanish painters
Spanish male painters
Spanish Baroque painters
Painters from Seville